Frederick William Chapman (10 May 1883 – 7 September 1951) was an English amateur footballer who competed in the 1908 Summer Olympics.

Club career
Chapman played for Notts Magdala, Nottingham Forest and South Nottingham, making three Football League appearances for Forest. He also guested for Port Vale in a league match against local rivals Stoke Reserves on 23 April 1910; Vale were 2–0 up when the match was abandoned due to a pitch invasion. In the summer of 1910 he agreed to assist the Vale "in times of need", but he was not called into action for the club again.

He went on to co-found English Wanderers and later played for Oxford City, South Nottingham, Southall and Brentford. He also guested for Northern Nomads and Notts County.

International career
Chapman made several appearances for the England amateur team between 1908 and 1910, netting 5 goals and being a member of the English amateur team that represented Great Britain at the football tournament of the 1908 Summer Olympics. Chapman played in all three games as a midfielder and netted two goals, scoring once in a 12–1 trashing of Sweden in the quarter-finals and then clutching the opening goal of the final in a 2–0 win over Denmark, thus contributing decisively to England's triumph in London. He also netted two unofficial goals, a brace in a 5–2 win over Wales on 20 February 1909.

Career statistics
Source:

International goals
England Amateurs score listed first, score column indicates score after each Chapmane goal.

References

External links
 

Footballers from Nottingham
Association football midfielders
English footballers
England amateur international footballers
Olympic footballers of Great Britain
English Olympic medallists
Olympic gold medallists for Great Britain
Olympic medalists in football
Nottingham Forest F.C. players
Port Vale F.C. players
Oxford City F.C. players
Brentford F.C. players
Southall F.C. players
Notts County F.C. wartime guest players
Northern Nomads F.C. players
English Football League players
Footballers at the 1908 Summer Olympics
Medalists at the 1908 Summer Olympics
1883 births
1951 deaths